Belgium competed at the 2018 European Athletics Championships in Berlin, Germany, between 7 and 12 August 2018. A delegation of 34 athletes were sent to represent the country.

The following athletes were selected to compete by the Royal Belgian Athletics League.

Medals

* – Indicates the athlete competed in preliminaries but not the final

Results
 Men 
 Track and road

* – Indicates the athlete competed in preliminaries but not the final

Field events

Combined events – Decathlon

Women
 Track and road

* – Did not run in either the heats or the finals 

Field events

Combined events – Heptathlon

References

European Athletics Championships
2018
Nations at the 2018 European Athletics Championships